Dance in Thailand (or) is the main dramatic art form in Thailand. Thai dance can be divided into two major categories, high art (classical dance) and low art (folk dance).

Overview 
The Thai terms for dance, รำ 'ram', and ระบำ 'rabam' derive from the Old Khmer words រាំ 'raṃ' and របាំ 'rapaṃ', respectively. There is an extended influence of ancient Khmer forms on Thai Classical dance and performance. This is due to the multitude of Khmer words relating to dance, music and performance, along with the similarities found between the gestures of Thai dancers’ depictions in ancient Khmer sculpture and bas reliefs.

According to Surapone Virulrak, Thai performance art took shape during the Ayutthaya period. At this time, Chak nak Dukdamban, a "ceremony depicting the churning of the ocean to create the immortal spirit", was performed on special occasions. This ceremony drew from the Indian epic of the Mahābhārata. Virulrak states, "These performing arts were gradually developed into Khon (masked play), lakhon nok (public dance drama) and lakhon nai (court dance drama) during the Late Ayutthaya Period (1456-1767)", adding, "this period also enjoyed various imported performing arts from neighbouring countries." According to Paul Cravath, this ceremony was also depicted in bas-reliefs at Angkor Wat and could have been the forefather of Khon.

Aside from folk and regional dances (such as southern Thailand's Indian-influenced Manora dance), the two major forms of Thai classical dance drama are Khon and lakhon nai. In the beginning, both were exclusively court entertainments and it was not until much later that a popular style of dance theatre, likay, evolved as a diversion for the common folk who had no access to royal performances.

Classical dance drama 

The first detailed European record of Khon and other Thai classical dances was made during the Ayutthaya Kingdom. The tradition and styles employed are almost identical to the Thai traditions we still see today. Historical evidence establishes that the Thai art of stage plays was already perfected by the 17th-century. Louis XIV, the Sun King of France, had a formal diplomatic relation with Ayutthaya's King Narai. In 1687, France sent the diplomat Simon de la Loubère to record all that he saw in the Siamese Kingdom and its traditions. In his famous account Du Royaume de Siam, La Loubère carefully observed the classic 17th-century theatre of Siam, including an epic battle scene from a Khon performance, and recorded what he saw in great detail:The Siamese have three sorts of Stage Plays: That which they call Cone [Khon] is a figure dance, to the sound of the violin and some other instruments. The dancers are masked and armed and represent rather combat than a dance. And though everyone runs into high motions, and extravagant postures, they cease not continually to intermix some word. Most of their masks are hideous and represent either monstrous Beasts or kinds of Devils. The Show which they call Lacone is a poem intermix with Epic and Dramatic, which lasts three days, from eight in the morning till seven at night. They are histories in verse, serious, and sung by several actors always present, and which do only sing reciprocally.... The Rabam is a double dance of men and women, which is not martial, but gallant ... they can perform it without much tyring themselves, because their way of dancing is a simple march round, very slow, and without any high motion; but with a great many slow contortions of the body and arms.

Of the attires of Siamese Khon dancers, La Loubère recorded that: "[T]hose that dance in Rabam, and Cone, have gilded high and pointed. It was introduced by Persian Lombok hat in King Naraya reign.  but which hang down at the sides below their ears, which are adorned with counterfeit stones, and with two pendants of gilded wood."

La Loubère also observed the existence of muay Thai and muay Lao, noting that they looked similar (i.e., using both fists and elbows to fight), but the hand-wrapping techniques were different.

The accomplishment and influence of Thai art and culture, developed during the Ayutthaya Period, on neighboring countries was evident in the observation of Captain James Low a British scholar of Southeast Asia, during the early Rattanakosin Era:

Lakhon

Lakhon features a wider range of stories than Khon, including folk tales and Jataka stories. Dancers are usually female who play both male and female roles and perform as a group rather than representing individual characters. Lakhon draws inspiration primarily from the Ramakien (Thai adaptation of Hindu epic Ramayana). Percussion instruments and piphat, a type of woodwind, accompany the dance. Thai literature and drama draw great inspiration from Indian arts and legends.

Khon

Khon is the most stylized form of Thai dance. It is performed by troupes of non-speaking dancers, the story being told by a chorus at the side of the stage. Choreography follows traditional models rather than attempting to innovate. Most Khon performances feature episodes from the Ramakien. Costumes are dictated by tradition, with angels, both good and bad, wearing colored masks.

Fon
Fon is a form of folk dance accompanied by the folk music of the region. The first fon originated in the northern region of Thailand. It was designed and taught by Chao Dararasami of Chiang Mai. Since then, a variety of fon came into practice, featuring the music and style of each province, such as the fon lep fingernail dance from Chiang Mai and the fon ngiew from Chiang Rai, which was influenced by Burmese music and costume.

Fon is divided into three types:

 Fon lep (fingernail dance): A northern Thai dance style. Each dancer wears six-inch-long brass fingernails. The long fingernails accentuate the finger movement of each dancer. Dancers wear their hair in a chignon-style with a yellow jasmine flower tiara.
 Fon tian (candle dance): A performance consists of eight dancers, each carrying candles. Dancers are in pairs, one pair to each side. They wear full-length sarongs and jackets with a matching shoulder cloth. This dance is always held at night.
 Fon ngiew (scarf dance): A dance performed at a happy event. The dance is similar to the fon lep but the dance is faster and more fun. Each dancer wears a yellow flower tiara, jong kra bane, and sabai.

The influence of Thai classical dance in neighboring countries
Thai classical arts exercised a strong influence on neighboring countries, especially Burma and Cambodia. The two golden periods of Burmese literature were the direct consequences of the Thai literary influence. The first transmission happened during the two-decade period (1564–83), in which the Toungoo Dynasty briefly managed to subject Siam as its vassal state. This conquest incorporated many Thai elements into Burmese literature. the most evident ones were the yadu or yatu, an emotional and philosophic verse and the yagan genre. The next transmission of Thai literary influence to Burma happened in the aftermath of the fall of Ayutthaya Kingdom in 1767. After the second conquest of Ayutthaya (Thailand), many Siamese royal dancers and poets were brought back to the court of Konbaung. Ramakien, the Thai version of Ramayana, was introduced and was adapted in Burmese where it is now called Yama Zatdaw. Burmese literature during this period was therefore modelled after the Ramayana, and dramatic plays were patronised by the Burmese court.

Cambodia had fallen into the control of Siamese hegemony around the reign of King Naresuan. But it was during the Thonburi Kingdom that the high cultures of the Rattanakosin Kingdom were systematically transmitted to the Cambodian court, which absorbed them voraciously. As Fédéric Maurel, a French historian notes:

It was during this period of Siamization that Thai literary influence had a wholesale impact on the Khmer literature. The Nirat or Siamese tradition of parting poetry was emulated by Khmer poets, and many Thai stories, such as Ka Kee, were translated from the Siamese source into the Khmer language. One study on comparative literature found that Cambodia's current version of Ramayana (Reamker) was translated directly from the Thai source, almost stanza by stanza. The Cambodian royal court used to stage Thai lakhon dramas in the Thai language during King Narodom's reign.

Folk dance
Folk dance forms include dance theater forms like likay, numerous regional dances (ram), the ritual dance ram muay, and homage to the teacher, wai khru. Both ram muay and wai khru take place before all traditional muay Thai matches. The wai is also an annual ceremony performed by Thai classical dance groups to honor their artistic ancestors.

 Ram wong is a type of partner dance in a circle.
 Ram muay is the ritualized dance that takes place before Southeast Asian kickboxing matches such as muay Thai.
 Wai khru Wai khru ram muay is a ritualized form of dance meant to pay respect to or homage to the khru, or teacher. It is performed annually by Thai classical dance institutions as well as before muay Thai matches.

Regional dances

Central Thailand 
Ram si nuan: A typical dance of central Thailand. Its great popularity is due to the choreography and the sweetness of the music that accompanies it. The lyrics and music evoke the sweet nature of Thai girls. The dance is also an expression of the yearning of a young man won over by such great charm.
Ram thoet thoeng ('drum dance'): The teut-teung drum, an instrument used in Thai folk music, is played throughout the country to accompany the parades held at traditional festivals. It is said that the modern style of the teut-teung dance was created by some music teachers.
Rabam chao na ('farmers' dance'): This is a modern dance created by the Thai Ministry of Culture. The dancers wear the rice growers' traditional costume, and the dance itself enacts the daily activities of these workers who are the backbone of the nation. The ballet opens with the farmers as they come to plough and sow the fields. When they are sure that the rice is growing well, they gather together to pray to Mae Po Sop, the goddess who protects rice-growing. Lastly, the harvest is celebrated with songs and dancing.
Ram krabi krabong: These dances are inspired by types of combat that were typical of Thailand, in which either sticks or swords are used. The skillful use of the short stick depends on the agility of the fighter, who must attack and always remain close to his opponent, while the combatant who takes up the long stick must maintain a critical distance from his rival to use his weapon effectively. The art of sword fighting has been practiced in Thailand since the beginning of time, and, traditionally, a ceremonial dance is performed prior to combat.

Northeast Thailand 
Serng kratip khoa: This dance is performed during traditional celebrations. Usually, the word serng is added to the name of the domestic object used on stage by the dancers. In the case of the serng kratip, the dancers carry typical rice baskets, known as kratip. Their movements imitate those of the women who bring food to the men working in the fields. The choreography is accompanied by music with a lively rhythm. The instruments used are a long drum, charb (cymbals), grab (a kind of castanet), mong (gong), and the kahen (similar to an old-fashioned syringe).
Serng Isan: This folk dance is generally performed at traditional festivals. The choreography is entrusted to the dancers, who wear brightly colored costumes and express all the joy of the celebration.
Fon Phu Thai: This dance is part of a propitiatory ceremony performed by the Phu Thai tribe, who live in the northeast. The music that accompanies it is played on typical instruments like the gong ching (a tribal drum), along with other drums and pipes. The gong ching plays a fundamental part because it sets the rhythm for the dance.
Serng krapo ('coconut dance'): Krapo is the word for 'coconut' in the Isan language. The dance illustrates the activities of a group of nubile girls from the southern part of the region, known as Isan. The dancers hold two coconut shells, with which they execute complex choreographic movements, shaking them, tossing them, or tapping them lightly. This dance is often accompanied by the sound of the pong lang, a kind of upright xylophone made of strips of wood arranged according to the musical scale.
Isan bantheong ('the happiness of Isan'): This is a series of folk dances usually performed on festive occasions. The swift, harmonious movements are accompanied by folk songs associated with the northeast region.

Northern Thailand 
Fon sao mai ('silk weaving dance'): Fon is a type of dance in northern and northeastern Thailand. It is performed in groups and has very slow, graceful, and almost meditative movements. Fon sao mai depicts a traditional profession of northern Thai women in silk weaving. The dance imitates different processes of silk-weaving. For generations, silk production is one of the top home industries in northern and northeastern Thailand and Laos.
Dance of the Nantha-peri and Pu-cha drums: The nantha-peri is a drum characteristic of northern Thailand, which is used for two purposes: to spur on warriors prior to battle and to pay homage to the Buddha in religious ceremonies. The pu-che, on the other hand, is a type of drum used by the tribes that live in the north: the Tay Yai, the Tai Lue and the Tay Yan. It is used to accompany various dances including, the sword dance, and the kai lai and king ka lai dances.
Sword Dance: This dance is inspired by an ancient martial art that requires tremendous courage and strength and excellent reflexes. The dancers balance a number of swords on different parts of their bodies while fighting off their rival with a sword sheath.
Ka-lai dance: Beginners learn to execute graceful and balanced movements through the choreography of this dance.
King-ka-la dance: The hand movements and steps of the female dancers, who wear spectacular fan-shaped costumes, evoke the movements of a bird.
The Sounds of the Mountains: The music that accompanies this dance is played on wind instruments characteristic of three tribes in North Thailand: the pi hom (a gourd pipe) of the Tai Lue, the pi joom of the Tay Yuan and the kan nam tao (a gourd flute) of the Li Saw.
Candle Dance: Typical of the Thai Kheun tribe, this dance is performed in honor of the Buddha. The female dancers pay homage to the divinities that protect the eight cardinal points of the Earth, asking them to pass through the candlelight in homage to the Buddha.
Khan Dok Dance: The striking choreography of this dance of blessing expresses the calm, serene temperament of the northern peoples.
Choeng Tua Auk-son Dance: This dance, performed in the Buddha's honor, is characterized by a complex choreography inspired by the calligraphy of the ancient alphabets of the northern regions and by the movements used in martial arts.
The Sounds of Lanna, the Ancient Kingdom of the North: This music is played on two instruments typical of this region. The phin-phia is a stringed instrument whose body is made from a coconut shell. When he plays it, the musician rests the shell on his bare chest, then moves it or presses it to achieve the desired tonality. In the past, the phin-phia was the instrument used by youths to court the maidens of their village. Few musicians still play it. The sueng is a stringed instrument made of teak or hardwood. It is played by plucking the two metal or brass strings with a horn plectrum.

Southern Thailand 
Nora: Nora is a traditional dance of southern Thailand (called the Chatri in southern Thai ). Its origins lie in various legends, which there are different versions of. The choreography of Nora varies from region to region, but it is generally composed of 12 positions and 17 movements.
Nora tua oon: This more refined version of Nora often requires greater interpretive skills and experience. Nora tua oon is often studied from a very young age so that the body can achieve the flexibility necessary to execute the dance's complicated movements. Female Nora tua oon dancers follow a demanding exercise regime and strict discipline.
Ram taeng kae: Ram taeng kae is an elaborate Nora dance that requires great interpretative skills. In the dance, the protagonist launches a harpoon at a crocodile, whose back, lit by candles, is made from the trunk of a banyan tree. A female dancer moves around the writhing crocodile, poised to pierce its head at the right moment.
Ram Nora son ram: This dance consists of a basic posture, which is executed by concentrating on hand, arm, and shoulder movements, as well as on the equilibrium and movement of various parts of the body. Ram Nora son ram is accompanied by long lyrics.
Ram kien pral / yieb louk manao / ram ko soet: This advanced level of Nora is usually performed during competitions between two groups of dancers. To intimidate the rival group, a male dancer strikes an effigy. In the yieb louk manao version, the female protagonist stamps on three lemons, symbolizing the hearts of the rivals. The dance is performed as a sign of victory. Afterward, the female protagonist asks the pran, a comical hunter, to give her a headdress as a symbol of her victory. This is a ceremonial ritual carried out to dishonor rivals and to encourage the members of the group. The dance is characterized by a certain sacredness.
Ram Nora bot pratom: The choreography of ram Nora bot pratom uses a basic posture in which hand, arm, and shoulder movements are synchronized with head movements.
Ram ooak pran: In a Nora performance company, the pran, or hunter, plays the part of the fool. He usually wears a hunter's mask or headdress, and the movements are often amusing and designed to make the audience laugh. Each position is in harmony with the dynamic rhythm of the music.
Ram Nora klong Hong: This advanced level of Nora is performed only on important occasions. The female protagonist plays the role of Hong or kinnaree, a legendary creature who is half woman and half bird. According to a celebrated Nora teacher, ram Nora klong Hong is partly based on the legend of Prasuton-Manora: the seven kinnaree play in the lake in the middle of a wood. Struck by their beauty and lightheartedness, pran Boon, the hunter, chases the maidens in an attempt to catch the youngest. The lively, harmonious movements perfectly evoke pran Boon's pursuit of the kinnaree as the youngest tries to escape.
Ram Nora tam bot / ram ooak pran: In this dance, the hand movements evoke the beautiful scenery of Songkhla Province in South Thailand. The verses of the song are accompanied by a lively rhythm.
Rabam Srivichai / rabam Sevichai: This is one of the so-called "Thai archaeological dances". It is a reinvented dance that represents the kingdom of Srivijaya, an 8th to 13th-century Buddhist maritime empire that encompassed present-day Indonesia, Malaysia, and south Thailand. The choreography and dance costumes are based on images carved as a bas-relief on the stupa of Borobudur in central Java and other artifacts of the Srivijaya period. The musical melody is composed in Javanese style, while its colors, black, red, and green, are characteristic of southern Thailand. The dance headdress is called a krabang naa. Some of the movements, poses, and stances are based on classical Javanese and Balinese dance traditions.

See also
 Dance of Cambodia
 Dance of Indonesia
 Balinese dance
 Javanese dance
 Sundanese dance

References

External links

 Khon Masks of Thailand
 Khon, classic theatre and dance
 Archival footage of PillowTalk: Thailand's Traditions Today at Jacob's Pillow, 7/15/2010
 Patravadi theatre presents Chalawan The Likay Musical.
 Banramthai website (in Thai and English)

 
Thai culture
Thai dance
Asian dances